A snipe is a wading bird.

Snipe may also refer to:

 Woodcock

People 
Snipe (rapper), American rapper from New Orleans
Snipe Conley (1894–1978), baseball pitcher
Snipe Hansen (1907–1978), baseball pitcher for the Philadelphia Phillies and St. Louis Browns

Places 
Snipe, Texas, a town in the US
Outpost Snipe, a World War II location in the Second Battle of El Alamein
Snipe, an islet between Chile and Argentina; see Snipe incident

Technology and transportation
Snipe (dinghy), class of racing sailboat
Snipe (wood machining), an unwanted deeper cut at the end of a board
Globe KDG Snipe, an American target drone
Humber Super Snipe, an automobile
Sopwith Snipe, a World War I biplane fighter

Marketing
Snipe (graphic), an ad appearing on a TV screen during a program
Snipe (theatrical), a short announcement trailer on behalf of the theater

Fictional characters
Snipe (My Hero Academia), a character in the manga series My Hero Academia
The Snipe, one of the Titans in Crash of the Titans, an action-adventure game published by Sierra Entertainment

Other uses
"Snipe" (song), a 2009 J-pop song by Kotoko
Snipe hunt, a class of practical jokes
Snipe incident, a 1958 military incident between Chile and Argentina in the Snipe Islet
Auction sniping, a strategy of placing a winning bid at the last possible moment
Guttersnipe or snipe, a person of low character

See also
Snipes (disambiguation)
Snipe Fly, insects in the order Diptera, genus Rhagionidae
Sniper (disambiguation)
Snape (disambiguation)